Benjamin Damon "Benj" Sampson (born April 27, 1975) is a former Major League Baseball pitcher who played for the Minnesota Twins in  and . Sampson also pitched 11 seasons in the minor leagues, recording more than 6 strikeouts per 9 innings pitched, and winning 72 games. He also pitched internationally for the 2004 Uni-President Lions, posting a 1-2 record with a 1.29 ERA in 21 innings pitched.

External links

1975 births
Living people
Baseball players from Des Moines, Iowa
Minnesota Twins players
Nettuno Baseball Club players
American expatriate baseball players in Taiwan
Edmonton Trappers players
Elizabethton Twins players
Fort Myers Miracle players
Fort Wayne Wizards players
Hardware City Rock Cats players
New Britain Rock Cats players
Salt Lake Buzz players
Tulsa Drillers players
Uni-President Lions players
American expatriate baseball players in Canada
American expatriate baseball players in Italy